Simon Glen Watts is a New Zealand politician.  he is an elected Member of Parliament in the House of Representatives for the National Party.

Early life and career
Watts was born in Cambridge, Waikato, where his family were orchardists. He has two younger brothers.

Watts has bachelor's degrees in management, accounting and finance, and health science. He has worked in both the private and public sector roles in New Zealand, Asia and the United Kingdom. During the Global Financial Crisis he was working for the Royal Bank of Scotland in London in various management roles. He is a chartered accountant and was later deputy chief financial officer at the Waitematā District Health Board. He also has a Bachelor of Paramedicine from the Auckland University of Technology, and at one point worked as a front-line ambulance officer for St John.

Political career

In 2018 Watts attempted to gain the National nomination in the Northcote by-election to replace former Cabinet Minister Jonathan Coleman, but lost to Dan Bidois.

Watts was selected as the National candidate for the North Shore electorate in March 2020, ahead of four other nominees including former Devonport-Takapuna Local Board member Joe Bergin and Kaipātiki Local Board member Danielle Grant. Watts stated his objectives in politics are giving more government support to the health sector and building more roads and new infrastructure. He is also concerned about improving wastewater networks to improve water quality at beaches.

During the 2020 New Zealand general election, he was elected to the North Shore seat by a margin of 3,734 votes, defeating Labour's candidate Romy Udanga.

Personal life
Watts is married with two sons. His wife works in marketing.

References

External links
 

Living people
New Zealand accountants
New Zealand National Party MPs
New Zealand MPs for Auckland electorates
Members of the New Zealand House of Representatives
21st-century New Zealand politicians
Year of birth missing (living people)